Peist railway station is a railway station on the Chur–Arosa railway (the "Arosabahn") of the Rhaetian Railway (RhB). It is situated very near to Peist, in the municipality of Arosa.

Services
The following services stop at Peist:

Postauto bus service 90.041 terminates/begins at Peist's Schulhaus, which is slightly less than a kilometre (by road) from the station. The bus route serves (places listed from Peist): Sankt Peter, Pagig, Tura, Castiel, Calfreisen, Sax and Maladers, before entering Chur.

References

External links
 
 

Railway stations in Graubünden
Rhaetian Railway stations
Railway stations in Switzerland opened in 1914